Camp Hi-Rock is a YMCA summer camp for boys and girls in the Berkshires region of western Massachusetts. They were founded in 1948 around Plantain Pond on Mt. Washington.

History
The camp was founded in 1948.

Structure

Campers
The residential campers are divided into six groups or "units" by age and gender. They live separately and eat together. They participate in daily activities together. Units are divided by cabins, each housing on average around ten campers and two or more staff members. 
 Woodlands: Girls age 7-9
 Abnaki: Boys age 7-9
 Wigwam: Girls age 10-12
 Frontier: Boys age 10-12
 Algonquin: Girls age 13-16
 Mohawk: Boys age 13-16

References

External links
 Official website

Hi-Rock
Hi-Rock
1948 establishments in Massachusetts
Buildings and structures in Berkshire County, Massachusetts